Taylor R. Randall is an American educator and academic administrator. In 2009, Randall was appointed the Dean of the University of Utah David Eccles School of Business and in August of 2021, he was appointed as the 17th President of the University of Utah.

Early life and education 
Randall was born in Berkeley, California and later raised in Salt Lake City, Utah. Randall graduated from the University of Utah with honors in Accounting and then went on to earn an M.B.A., a Masters Degree in Managerial Economics, and a Ph.D. in Operations and Information Management from the Wharton School of Business at the University of Pennsylvania.

Career

Professional Service 
In 1998, Randall joined the David Eccles School of Business as a professor of accounting where he examined the interactions between strategy, technology, products and value chain structure with particular emphasis on how these interactions affect financial performance in organizations. In his 11 years of professorship, Randall earned numerous accolades for his research and teaching. In 2001, Randall was awarded the Marvin J. Ashton Undergraduate Teaching Award and the David Eccles Emerging Scholar Award. In 2003, he was awarded the Brady Superior Teaching Award, the Best MBA Professor Award, and served as the Batten Visiting Fellow at the University of Virginia. In 2004, Randall received the Wharton Teaching Award from the University of Pennsylvania. In 2005, he was a finalist for Best Paper Award in California Management Review for his research on user design on product customization. 

In May of 2009, Randall was appointed the Dean of the University of Utah David Eccles School of Business. At the time of his appointment, former University of Utah President Michael K. Young described Randall as "a gifted teacher and leader and carries an unparalleled grasp of economic performance and strategies that makes him the ideal choice for leading this great school to even greater heights." During his tenure as a Dean, Randall has focused on elevating the student experience by vastly increasing the number of experiential learning opportunities for students. The openings of the Marriner S. Eccles Institute for Economics and Quantitative Analysis, the Kem C. Gardner Policy Institute, the Sorenson Impact Center, and the Goff Strategic Leadership Center have provided students with unparalleled and invaluable learning opportunities, in fields ranging from entrepreneurship to social impact to policy development. Under his direction, the school has improved its rankings, with eight of the school’s programs ranking within the Top 25. 

On August 5th, 2021, Randall was selected as the 17th President of the University of Utah.  

In addition to his work in the classroom and the President’s office, Randall has served as visiting faculty at Wharton, Washington University and INSEAD.

Volunteer service  
Since 2016, he has been actively engaged in AACSB, serving on numerous Continuous Improvement Review site visits, and on the AACSB Continuous Improvement Review Committee. 

In 2017, Randall was elected as the President of the Southwest Dean’s Association. 

In early 2020, Randall was selected by the Governor of Utah to join the Utah Health & Economic Recovery task-force with the objective of stopping the spread of COVID-19 and re-engaging the State of Utah's social and economic activity.

Personal life 
Randall and his wife have four children and currently reside in Salt Lake City, Utah.

Research 

 Randall, T., & Harry Groenevelt, Nils Rudi. (2009). End-of-Period vs. Continuous Accounting of Inventory-Related Costs. Operations Research. Discipline based - refereed, Published, 12/2009.http://or.journal.informs.org/cgi/content/abstract/57/6/1360
 Randall, T., & Gerard Cachon, Glen Schmidt. (2007). In Search of the Bullwhip Effect. Manufacturing and Service Operations Management. Discipline based - refereed, Published, 09/2007.
 Randall, T., & Christian Terweisch, Karl Ulrich. (2007). User Design of Customized Products. Marketing Science. Discipline based - refereed, Published, 03/2007.
 Randall, T., & Serguei Netessine, Nils Rudi. (2006). An Empirical Examination of the Decision to Invest in Fulfillment Capabilities: A Study of Internet Retailers. Management Science. Discipline based - refereed, Published, 2006.
 Randall, T., & Susan Kulp, Gregg Brandyberry, Kevin Potts. (2006). Internal Control Systems and Incentives: The Next Phase of Procurement Efficiency. Interfaces. Discipline based - refereed, Published, 05/2006.
 Randall, T., & Christian Terweisch, Karl Ulrich. (2005). Principles for User Design of Customized Products. California Management Review. Practice - refereed, Published, 2005.
 Randall, T., & Susan Chesteen, Berit Helgheim, Don Wardell. (2005). Comparing quality of care in for profit and non-profit nursing homes: a process perspective. Journal of Operations Management. Discipline based - refereed, Published, 2005.
 Randall, T., & Ruskin Morgan and Alysse Morton. (2004). Efficient versus Responsive Supply Chain Choice: An Empirical Investigation. Journal of Product Innovation Management. Published, 2004.
 Randall, T., & Christopher Ittner and David Larcker. (2004). Performance Implications of Strategic Performance Measurement in Financial Services Firms. Accounting Organizations and Society. Published, 2004.
 Randall, T., & Christopher Ittner, David Larcker. (2003). Performance Implications of Strategic Performance Measurement in Financial Services Firms. Accounting Organizations and Society. Discipline based - refereed, Published, 10/2003.
 Randall, T., & Nils Rudi and Serguei Netessine. (2002). Should you take the Virtual Path. Supply Chain Management Review. Published, 11/2002.
 Randall, T., & Karl Ulrich. (2001). Product Variety, Supply Chain Structure, and Firm Performance: An Empirical Examination of the U.S. Bicycle Industry. Management Science. Published, 12/2001.
 Randall, T., & David Reibstein and Karl Ulrich. (1998). Brand Equity and Line Extension: How Low Can You Go?. (pp. 7 thru 8). Financial Times, Part Four of Mastering Marketing. Published, 10/1998.
 Randall, T., & with Karl Ulrich, Marshall Fisher, and David Reibstein. (1998). Managing Product Variety: A Study of the Bicycle Industry. Managing Product Variety. Published, 1998.
 Randall, T., & Christopher Ittner and David Larcker. (1997). The Activity Based Cost Hierarchy, Production Policies and Firm Profitability. Journal of Management Accounting Research. Published, 1997.

References 

Year of birth missing (living people)
Living people
Presidents of the University of Utah